The 1924–25 United States collegiate men's ice hockey season was the 31st season of collegiate ice hockey in the United States.

Regular season

Standings

References

1924–25 NCAA Standings

External links
College Hockey Historical Archives

1924–25 United States collegiate men's ice hockey season
College